= Pt-barrel =

Orf2-like Prenyltransferase
- Crystal structure of a PT-barrel protein.

Identifiers
- Symbol: PTase_Orf2
- Pfam: PF11468
- InterPro: IPR020965
- SCOP2: 1zb6 / SCOPe / SUPFAM
Available protein structures:
- PDB: 1zb6, 1zdy, 1zdw, 1czw IPR020965 PF11468 (ECOD; PDBsum)
- AlphaFold: IPR020965; PF11468

The PT-barrel, is a novel protein fold that was discovered in the crystal structure of the prenyltransferase, Orf2 from Streptomyces sp. strain CL190.

== Structure ==
The PT-barrel consists of a closed β-sheet comprising ten anti-parallel β-strands arranged around a central β-barrel core, itself surrounded by a ring of α-helices forming the outer, solvent exposed surface of the barrel.

The secondary connectivity nearly conforms to an (ααββ)_{5} classification, but is more specifically described using the (ααββ)_{4}-(αββ)−α nomenclature, where helices 6 and 8, both involved in inter-protein contacts in the crystal lattice, display a helical “kink”. The most hydrophobic section of the PT-barrel is the region residing between the outer surface of the cylindrical β-barrel and the belt of surrounding α-helices. Additionally, a number of hydrophobic residues located inside the barrel accommodate the prenyl tail of the Geranyl-diPhosphate (GPP) and GSPP molecules, while the diphosphate or the thio-diphosphate head groups of substrate and substrate analogs, respectively, point toward the “upper”, more polar end of the barrel where a Mg^{2+} ion is coordinated. Finally, the bottom of the barrel is capped by a short C-terminal helix (α11).

== Press Releases ==
Promiscuous Catalytic Activity Possessed by Novel Enzyme Structure, June 15, 2005
SSRL Science Highlight July 2005
LightSource.org Press Release Number: PR-SSRL-05-3
